Vasant ke Hatyare (Hindi: वसंत के हत्यारे) is a short story collection by Hrishikesh Sulabh, comprising 9 stories in Hindi written over 10 years from 2003 to 2009. It has won the author the 16th Indu Sharma International Katha Samman given by Katha UK.

Etymology

Editions in print
India - 
Work under progress

References

Hindi-language literature
Indian short story collections
2009 short story collections